The collateral eminence is an elongated swelling lying lateral parallel with the hippocampus. It corresponds with the medial part of the collateral fissure, and its size depends on the depth and direction of this fissure. It is continuous behind with a flattened triangular area, the trigone of the lateral ventricle, situated between the posterior and inferior horn. It is not always present.

References

Cerebrum
Anatomical variations